Hilary Gardner (19 April 1922 – 11 August 2012) was a South African cricketer. He played in two first-class matches for Eastern Province in 1939/40.

See also
 List of Eastern Province representative cricketers

References

External links
 

1922 births
2012 deaths
South African cricketers
Eastern Province cricketers
People from Makhanda, Eastern Cape
Cricketers from the Eastern Cape